Daniele Romano (born 5 May 1993) is an Italian footballer who plays for FC Baden.

Career

Club career
Romano signed with SC Cham on 21 January 2019. After his second game for Scham, he got injured with a torn meniscus and didn't play any more games for the club. He left the club at the end of the season. In January 2020, he began training with FC Baden without playing for the club. However, he was registered to play for the club from the 2020–21 season.

Personal life
Daniele is the nephew of Salvatore Romano.

References

External links
 

1993 births
Living people
Swiss men's footballers
Italian footballers
Swiss Super League players
Swiss Challenge League players
Swiss Promotion League players
FC Aarau players
FC Wohlen players
FC Lausanne-Sport players
SC Cham players
FC Baden players
Place of birth missing (living people)
Association football midfielders